Mobridge Municipal Airport  is a city-owned public-use airport located one nautical mile (1.15 mi, 1.85 km) northeast of the central business district of Mobridge, a city in Walworth County, South Dakota, United States. It is included in the FAA's National Plan of Integrated Airport Systems for 2011–2015, which categorized it as a general aviation facility.

Facilities and aircraft 
It has two runways: 12/30 is 4,410 by 75 feet (1,344 x 23 m) with an asphalt pavement and 17/35 is 2,399 by 250 feet (731 x 76 m) with a turf surface.

For the 12-month period ending June 28, 2010, the airport had 15,764 aircraft operations, an average of 43 per day: 98% general aviation, 2% air taxi, and <1% military. At that time there were 11 single-engine aircraft based at this airport.

References

External links 
 Mobridge (MBG) at SDDOT Airport Directory
 Aerial photo as of 4 October 1997 from USGS The National Map
 

Airports in South Dakota
Buildings and structures in Walworth County, South Dakota
Transportation in Walworth County, South Dakota